Sidari is a settlement in the northern part of the island of Corfu, Greece. It is a community of the municipal unit of Esperies. In 2011, its population was 386.

Population

See also

List of settlements in the Corfu regional unit

References

Populated places in Corfu (regional unit)